René Cabrera (born 16 April 1998) is a Paraguayan professional footballer who plays as a striker for Club Nacional.

References

External links
 

1998 births
Living people
Association football forwards
Paraguayan footballers
Club Nacional footballers